Jewett may refer to:

Places

United States

 Jewett House, a dormitory of Vassar College

Jewett, Illinois
Jewett, Minnesota
Jewett, Missouri
Jewett, New York
Jewett, Ohio
Jewett, Texas
Jewett, Wisconsin
Jewett City, Connecticut

Other uses
Jewett (surname)
Jewett staging system, a system for describing the state of prostate cancer
Jewett (automobile), the name of an automobile manufactured by the Paige-Detroit Motor Car Company from 1923 to 1926
Jewett Car Company, an Ohio manufacturer of street cars

See also
 Jewitt